Spøttrup Castle is a well-preserved medieval defensive castle located  northwest of Skive in Jutland, Denmark.

History
The estate was transferred to the Diocese of Viborg in 1404. It became the property of the Crown in 1536 and was sold to Henrik Below (1540–1606), a nobleman with the Danish court. The oldest section of the building is the south wing, which was constructed c. 1521. The east and north wings followed between 1525 and 1530. The western end of the north wing was destroyed by an incoming tidal wave in 1534. The large arched windows were walled up, leaving only narrow sighting slits. The oldest part of the building is the cellar with cross vaults supported by pillars. 
The ramparts and the double moat served to defend the castle from cannon fire.

After Below acquired the castle, he fitted it out as a stately family home with towers and a ballroom. With the Reformation, the castle lost its importance as a fort and was uninhabited for an extended period. In 1702, Axel Rosenkrantz acquired the dilapidated property and proceeded to renovate it. On his death in 1724, his son Mogens Rosenkrantz took it over. In 1784, Peder Nissen, a rich farmer from Ribe bought the castle, leaving it to his 17-year-old son Nis Nissen when he died four years later. After Nis's death in 1849, the property came into the hands of successive owners, none of whom were able to carry out necessary repairs. Finally, after a fire in 1937, the state decided to acquire the castle and the  estate. Restoration work was completed in 1941, leading to the opening of the building as a museum on 15 June 1941.

Open to visitors
The castle museum is open to visitors from mid-April to the end of October.

References

External links

Spøttrup Middelalderborg website in Danish

Infrastructure completed in 1530
Listed buildings and structures in Skive Municipality
Castles in the Central Denmark Region
Listed castles and manor houses in Denmark
Tourist attractions in the Central Denmark Region
Historic house museums in Denmark